Vlad Țepeș is a 1979 Romanian historical drama film directed by Doru Năstase. The film recounts the story of Vlad the Impaler (also known as Vlad Dracula), the mid-15th century Voivode of Wallachia, and his fights with the Ottoman Turks on the battlefield and with the Boyars in his court.

Commissioned by the Communist authorities, the movie promoted the line that Nicolae Ceaușescu had drawn through the July Theses of 1971, by projecting the image of a strong, authoritarian leader who is right with the people. It also had the purpose to wash the name of the voivode from the shame caused by Bram Stoker's novel. The fabrication of the myth of Dracula is highlighted in the film: it was built by outside elements (on the one hand, the Saxon and Szekler merchants from Brașov, and on the other, the enemies of Wallachia, the Turks), but also by the wicked and traitorous boyars.

Cast
 – Vlad the Impaler
Ernest Maftei – Străjer Mânzila
 – Armaș Stoica
 – Boyar Albu
Alexandru Repan – Sultan Mehmed the Conqueror
Constantin Codrescu – Iunus Beg, envoy of the Sultan
George Constantin – Metropolite of Ungro-Wallachia
Ion Marinescu – Grand Vizier Mahmud Pasha
Silviu Stănculescu – Treasurer Sava
 – Boyar Mogoș
 – Michael Szilágyi, captain of Belgrade Fortress
 – Pope Pius II
 – Boyar Rătundu
 – Johannes Reudel, Vicar of Biserica Neagră, envoy of Brașov
Eugen Ungureanu – Matthias Corvinus, King of Hungary

 – Ottoman dignitary
 – Wallachian merchant
 – Stephen the Great, Prince of Moldavia

References

External links 

1970s historical drama films
1970s biographical drama films
Romanian historical drama films
Romanian biographical drama films
Films set in the Ottoman Empire
Films set in Romania
Films set in the 15th century
Cultural depictions of Vlad the Impaler
1979 drama films
1979 films